The United States Virgin Islands Police Department is the law enforcement agency for the United States Virgin Islands, which has jurisdiction anywhere in the territory.  It was created to protect the lives and property of residents. The Royal Virgin Islands Police Force is responsible for policing the British side.

History
The US Virgin Islands Police Department was created on June 22, 1936.

Fleet

The USVIPD operates Ford Escapes, Chevrolet Impalas, Ford Taurus, GMC Envoys, and Ford Explorers.

Officers are issued Glock sidearms.

References

1.St. Thomas Police Search for Missing Couple May 2,2008 
2.       
3.                     
4.
5.

External links
 USVI Police Department - Official site

+United States Virgin
Government of the United States Virgin Islands
Motor vehicle registration agencies
Government agencies established in 1936
1936 establishments in the United States Virgin Islands